Hungary is a nation that has competed at the Hopman Cup tournament on one occasion, in 2004, when they defeated Canada in the qualification play-off to reach the round robin stage of the tournament where they finished 3rd in their group.

Players
This is a list of players who have played for Hungary in the Hopman Cup.

Results

1 Although Hungary defeated Canada in the qualification play-off, the two teams faced each other for a second time in 2004 when Canada replaced the injured Belgian team for the final round robin tie.

References

Hopman Cup teams
Hopman Cup
Hopman Cup